Joseph Wilson  (born August 11, 1950) is a former professional American football running back who played in the National Football League (NFL) for two seasons. He played college football at Holy Cross.

College career
Wilson was a three year starter at running back for the Holy Cross Crusaders. He left the school as the school's record holder for most rushing yards in a game (274), a single season (973) and for a career (2,350). Wilson became the youngest male athlete and the first African-American athlete to be inducted into the Holy Cross Athletic Hall of Fame in 1978.

Professional career
Wilson was selected in the eighth round of the 1973 NFL Draft by the Cincinnati Bengals. He played in 13 games with the team as a rookie, rushing for 39 yards on ten carries and returning eight kickoffs for 173 yards. He was cut by the Bengals before the 1974 season and signed by the New England Patriots. He played in 12 games for the team, rushing 15 times for 57 yards and catching three passes for 38 yards.

References

1950 births
American football running backs
Holy Cross Crusaders football players
Cincinnati Bengals players
Players of American football from Massachusetts
People from Jamaica Plain
New England Patriots players
Living people